La settimana bianca (Girls Will Be Girls) is a 1980 Italian commedia sexy all'italiana directed by Mariano Laurenti.

Plot 
A group of employees, on a winter vacation, rather than skiing, spend their time in an attempt to impress the beautiful Angela and a sexy servant girl.

Cast 
 Annamaria Rizzoli as Angela Marconcini
 Gianfranco D'Angelo as Piergallini 
 Enzo Cannavale as Enzo Ercolani 
 Bombolo as G. Cesare 
 Jimmy il Fenomeno as spinster
 Carmen Russo as sexy maid
 Vincenzo Crocitti as Tarcisi 
 Giacomo Furia as Cavalier Pasquarelli 
 Paolo Giusti as Fabio
 Sal Borgese as Sardo
 Franca Mantelli as Matilde Marconcini
 Renzo Ozzano as Bruno Bartocci
 Gianluca Manunza as Tonino
 Graziella Polesinanti as Mr. Ercolani

See also   
 List of Italian films of 1980

References

External links

1980 films
Commedia sexy all'italiana
1980s sex comedy films
Films directed by Mariano Laurenti
Films set in Turin
Films scored by Gianni Ferrio
1980 comedy films
1980s Italian films